In probability theory, a probability distribution is infinitely divisible if it can be expressed as the probability distribution of the sum of an arbitrary number of independent and identically distributed (i.i.d.) random variables. The characteristic function of any infinitely divisible distribution is then called an infinitely divisible characteristic function.

More rigorously, the probability distribution F is infinitely divisible if, for every positive integer n, there exist n i.i.d. random variables Xn1, ..., Xnn whose sum Sn = Xn1 + … + Xnn has the same distribution F.

The concept of infinite divisibility of probability distributions was introduced in 1929 by Bruno de Finetti. This type of decomposition of a distribution is used in probability and statistics to find families of probability distributions that might be natural choices for certain models or applications. Infinitely divisible distributions play an important role in probability theory in the context of limit theorems.

Examples
Examples of continuous distributions that are infinitely divisible are the normal distribution, the Cauchy distribution, the Lévy distribution, and all other members of the stable distribution family, as well as the Gamma distribution, the chi-square distribution, the Wald distribution, the Log-normal distribution and the Student's t-distribution.

Among the discrete distributions, examples are the Poisson distribution and the negative binomial distribution (and hence the geometric distribution also). The one-point distribution whose only possible outcome is 0 is also (trivially) infinitely divisible.

The uniform distribution and the binomial distribution are not infinitely divisible, nor are any other distributions with bounded support (≈ finite-sized domain), other than the one-point distribution mentioned above. The distribution of the reciprocal of a random variable having a Student's t-distribution is also not infinitely divisible.

Any compound Poisson distribution is infinitely divisible; this follows immediately from the definition.

Limit theorem

Infinitely divisible distributions appear in a broad generalization of the central limit theorem: the limit as n → +∞ of the sum Sn = Xn1 + … + Xnn of independent uniformly asymptotically negligible (u.a.n.) random variables within a triangular array

approaches — in the weak sense — an infinitely divisible distribution. The uniformly asymptotically negligible (u.a.n.) condition is given by

 

Thus, for example, if the uniform asymptotic negligibility (u.a.n.) condition is satisfied via an appropriate scaling of identically distributed random variables with finite variance, the weak convergence is to the normal distribution in the classical version of the central limit theorem. More generally, if the u.a.n. condition is satisfied via a scaling of identically distributed random variables (with not necessarily finite second moment), then the weak convergence is to a stable distribution. On the other hand, for a triangular array of independent (unscaled) Bernoulli random variables where the u.a.n. condition is satisfied through

the weak convergence of the sum is to the Poisson distribution with mean λ as shown by the familiar proof of the law of small numbers.

Lévy process

Every infinitely divisible probability distribution corresponds in a natural way to a Lévy process.  A Lévy process is a stochastic process { Lt : t ≥ 0 } with stationary independent increments, where stationary means that for s < t, the probability distribution of Lt − Ls depends only on t − s and where independent increments means that that difference Lt − Ls is independent of the corresponding difference on any interval not overlapping with [s, t], and similarly for any finite number of mutually non-overlapping intervals.

If { Lt : t ≥ 0 } is a Lévy process then, for any t ≥ 0, the random variable Lt will be infinitely divisible: for any n, we can choose (Xn1, Xn2, …, Xnn) = (Lt/n − L0, L2t/n − Lt/n, …, Lt − L(n−1)t/n).  Similarly, Lt − Ls is infinitely divisible for any s < t.

On the other hand, if F is an infinitely divisible distribution, we can construct a Lévy process { Lt : t ≥ 0 } from it.  For any interval [s, t] where t − s > 0 equals a rational number p/q, we can define Lt − Ls to have the same distribution as Xq1 + Xq2 + … + Xqp.  Irrational values of t − s > 0 are handled via a continuity argument.

Additive process

An additive process   (a cadlag,  continuous in probability stochastic process with independent increments) has an infinitely divisible distribution for any . Let  be its family of infinitely divisible distributions.

 satisfies a number of conditions of continuity and monotonicity. Morover, if a family of  infinitely divisible distributions  satisfies these continuity and monotonicity conditions, there exists (uniquely in law) an additive process  with this distribution.

See also
Cramér's theorem
Indecomposable distribution
Compound Poisson distribution

Footnotes

References
 Domínguez-Molina, J.A.; Rocha-Arteaga, A. (2007) "On the Infinite Divisibility of some Skewed Symmetric Distributions".  Statistics and Probability Letters, 77 (6), 644–648 
 Steutel, F. W. (1979), "Infinite Divisibility in Theory and Practice" (with discussion), Scandinavian Journal of Statistics. 6, 57–64.
 Steutel, F. W. and Van Harn, K. (2003), Infinite Divisibility of Probability Distributions on the Real Line (Marcel Dekker).

Theory of probability distributions
Types of probability distributions